Richard Greenwood may refer to:

 Dick Greenwood (born 1940), former England rugby union international
 Richard A. Greenwood, Utah politician
 Richard Greenwood (Australian footballer) (1905–1987), Australian rules footballer